Phil(l)ip Williams may refer to:

Philip Williams (lawyer) (1780–1843), English lawyer and academic
Philip Williams (snooker player) (born 1968), Welsh amateur snooker player
Philip Williams (United States Navy) (1869–1942), American naval officer, military governor of the United States Virgin Islands
Philip Williams (MP), English politician
Philip Williams (cricketer, born 1824) (1824–1899), English cricketer
Philip Williams (cricketer, born 1884) (1884–1958), English cricketer
Philip J. Williams (1897–1981), member of the Michigan State House of Representatives
Philip Lee Williams (born 1950), American novelist, poet and essayist
Philip Maynard Williams (1920–1984), British political analyst
Philip Williams, American bassist in the band Brazil

See also
Phil Williams (disambiguation)